The 1982–83 season was Manchester United's 81st season in the Football League, and their 8th consecutive season in the top division of English football. They finished the season third in the league and won the FA Cup for the fifth time in their history, beating relegated Brighton 4–0 in the replay after drawing the first game 2–2. It was the breakthrough season for teenage striker Norman Whiteside, who was a regular first team player and scored 14 goals in all competitions, including one in the FA Cup final replay.

Atkinson had also added Dutch winger Arnold Muhren to the club's ranks on a free transfer from Ipswich Town before the start of the season, and the new signing was a success, establishing himself as United's regular left winger and scoring a penalty in the FA Cup final replay.

It was also a good second season at United for Frank Stapleton, who was the club's top scorer with 14 goals in the league and 19 in all competitions.

United reached their first League Cup final, but lost 2-1 to Liverpool.

First Division

FA Cup

League Cup

UEFA Cup

Squad statistics

References

Manchester United F.C. seasons
Manchester United